Israel Woolfork (born 1990) is an American football coach who is the quarterbacks coach for the Arizona Cardinals of the National Football League (NFL). He previously served as an assistant coach for the Cleveland Browns and Miami University.

Early years
A native of Livonia, Michigan, Woolfork attended Benjamin Franklin High School. He then went on to play as a wide receiver at Grand Valley State University from 2008 to 2012 and graduated with a degree in sports leadership.

Coaching career

Cleveland Browns
In 2021, Woolfork joined the Cleveland Browns under the Bill Walsh NFL diversity coaching fellowship. In 2022, Woolfork rejoined the Browns under the Bill Willis coaching fellowship.

Arizona Cardinals
On February 21, 2023, Woolfork was hired by the Arizona Cardinals as their quarterbacks coach under head coach Jonathan Gannon.

References

External links
 Arizona Cardinals profile
 Cleveland Browns profile
 Miami University profile
 Grand Valley State University profile

1990 births
Living people
American football wide receivers
Arizona Cardinals coaches
Cleveland Browns coaches
Coaches of American football from Michigan
Grand Valley State Lakers football players
Miami RedHawks football coaches 
Players of American football from Michigan 
Sportspeople from Livonia, Michigan